Fractint (originally FRACT386) is a freeware computer program to render and display many kinds of fractals. The program originated on MS-DOS, then ported to the Atari ST, Linux, and Macintosh. During the early 1990s, Fractint was the definitive fractal generating program for personal computers.

The name is a portmanteau of  fractal and integer, since the first versions of Fractint used only integer arithmetic (also known as fixed-point arithmetic), for faster rendering on computers without math coprocessors. Since then, floating-point arithmetic and arbitrary-precision arithmetic modes have been added.

FractInt can draw most kinds of fractals that have appeared in the literature. It also has a few "fractal types" that are not strictly speaking fractals, but may be more accurately described as display hacks. These include cellular automata.

Development

Fractint originally appeared in 1988 as FRACT386, a computer program for rendering fractals very quickly on the Intel 80386 processor using integer arithmetic. The 80386 requires the Intel 80387 coprocessor to natively support floating point math, which was rare in IBM PC compatibles.

Early versions of FRACT386 were written by Bert Tyler, who based it on a Mandelbrot generator for a TI-based processor that used integer math and decided to try programming something similar for his 386 machine.

In February 1989, the program was renamed Fractint. In July 1990, it was ported to the Atari ST, with the math routines rewritten in Motorola 68000 assembly language by Howard Chu.

See also

 Fractal art
 Fractal-generating software

References

Further reading
 Michael Frame, Benoit Mandelbrot, Fractals, Graphics, and Mathematics Education, Volume 58 of Mathematical Association of America Notes, Cambridge University Press, 2002, pp. 57–59 (and used throughout the book)

External links

Mirror of now-gone spanky.triumf.ca Fractint site
Fractint Development Team WWW pages via the Wayback Machine

1988 software
Fractal software
Numerical software
Cellular automaton software
DOS software
Atari ST software
Proprietary freeware for Linux